Ilyinsky is a rural locality (a settlement) and the administrative center of Ilyinsky District in Perm Krai, Russia, located on the banks of the Kama Reservoir. Population:

References

Rural localities in Perm Krai
Populated places in Ilyinsky District, Perm Krai
Permsky Uyezd